The Rogue Elk Hotel is a historic building in Trail, Oregon.

Description and history
The hotel was constructed in 1915 by W.G. McDonald, a Canadian artist and his brothers. Designed by Charles Power it reflects Colonial Revival and Stick architectural styles. The Rogue Elk Inn held its grand opening on July 22, 1916, with an event attended by 200 Rogue River Valley residents. Notable guests have included Herbert Hoover, Zane Grey and Clark Gable. In the 1950s McDonald died, his widow sold the building a period of decline began. It was listed on the National Register of Historic Places in 1980.

See also
 Historic preservation
 Oregon Trail

References

External links
 
 
 

Hotel buildings on the National Register of Historic Places in Oregon
Queen Anne architecture in Oregon
Colonial Revival architecture in Oregon
Hotel buildings completed in 1915
Buildings and structures in Jackson County, Oregon
1915 establishments in Oregon
National Register of Historic Places in Jackson County, Oregon